The Fall Risk, Volume No. 1 is the eponymous debut album by the band The Fall Risk. The album began production in March 2013 and was officially released on August 1, 2013, coinciding with the birthday of Jerry Garcia ("Jerry Day").

Track listing
"Cross My Heart" (Jeff Pehrson) - 4:16
"Wendy Ann" (Pehrson) - 4:14
"Angeline" (Pehrson) - 4:22
"Hollow" (Pehrson) - 3:50
"LeClair" (Pehrson) - 3:23
"Ode" (Pehrson) - 4:28
"Cry" (Pehrson) - 3:31
"Cry Baby Cry" (Pehrson) - 3:07
"HBWA" (Pehrson) - 4:17

Personnel
The Fall Risk
Jeff Pehrson — acoustic guitar, vocals
Phil Savell — lead guitar, rhythm guitar, resonator guitar
Mark Abbott — drums, percussion
Sammy Johnston — organ, accordion, harmonica, Mellotron, vocals
Rich Goldstein — slide guitar, lead guitar, rhythm guitar
Matt Twain — piano, keyboards, vocals
Mike Sugar — bass

Special Guests
Tony Furtado — banjo and bottleneck slide on "LeClair"
Jason Crosby — fiddle on "Angeline"

Production
Produced by Chris Manning
Executive producer: R. Cooper Gruen
Recorded at TRI Studios and Salamander Sound
Artwork and design: Gelsey Maslanka
Social media and PR: BANDAID Social Media
All songs written & Copyright Controlled by Jeff Pehrson (Oenophile Music, ASCAP)

References

The Fall Risk albums
2013 debut albums
Music of the San Francisco Bay Area